The First Jewish–Roman War (66–73 CE), sometimes called the Great Jewish Revolt, or The Jewish War, was the first of three major rebellions by the Jews against the Roman Empire, fought in Roman-controlled Judea, resulting in the destruction of Jewish towns, the displacement of its people and the appropriation of land for Roman military use, as well as the destruction of the Jewish Temple and polity.

The revolt began in 66 CE, during the twelfth year of the reign of Nero, originating in the oppressive rule of Roman governors, the widening gaps between the wealthy aristocracy and the downtrodden masses, and Roman and Jewish religious tensions. The crisis escalated due to anti-taxation protests and clashes between Jews and pagans in mixed cities. The Roman governor, Gessius Florus, seized money from the Second Temple's treasury and arrested numerous senior Jewish figures. This prompted widespread rebellion in Jerusalem that culminated in the capture of the Roman garrison by rebel forces as the pro-Roman king Herod Agrippa II and Roman officials fled. To quell the unrest, Cestius Gallus, the legate of Syria, brought in the Syrian army, consisting of the Legion XII Fulminata and auxiliary troops. Despite initial advances and the conquest of Jaffa, the Syrian Legion was ambushed and defeated by Jewish rebels at the Battle of Beth Horon with 6,000 Romans massacred and the Legion's aquila lost. In 66, a Judean provisional government was formed in Jerusalem led by former High Priest Ananus ben Ananus, Joseph ben Gurion and Joshua ben Gamla. Yosef ben Matityahu (Josephus) was appointed as the rebel commander in Galilee and Eleazar ben Hanania as the commander in Edom. Later, in Jerusalem, an attempt by Menahem ben Yehuda, leader of the Sicarii, to take control of the city failed. He was executed and the remaining Sicarii were ejected from the city. Simon bar Giora, a peasant leader, was also expelled by the new government.

The Roman general Vespasian was given four legions and tasked by Nero with crushing the rebellion. Assisted by forces of King Agrippa II, Vespasian invaded Galilee in 67, and within several months had claimed the major Jewish strongholds of Galilee, Jodapatha and Tarichaea. Driven from Galilee, Zealot rebels and thousands of refugees arrived in Jerusalem, creating tensions between the mainly Sadducee Jerusalemites and the Zealot rebel factions that soon erupted into bitter infighting. In 69, Vespasian was called to Rome and appointed emperor, leaving Titus to besiege Jerusalem in 70 CE. Following a brutal seven-month siege, during which Zealot infighting resulted in the burning of the entire food supplies of the city, the Romans finally succeeded in breaching the defenses in the summer of 70. Following the fall of Jerusalem, Titus departed for Rome, leaving the Legion X Fretensis to defeat the remaining Jewish strongholds, including Herodium and Machaerus. The Roman campaign ended with their success at the siege of Masada in 73–74.

The Roman suppression of the revolt had a significant impact on the local population, with many rebels perishing in battle or being sold into slavery. The temple of Jerusalem and much of the city was destroyed by fire and the Jewish community was thrown into turmoil by the devastation of its political and religious leadership.

Background

King Herod ruled Jerusalem from 37 BCE – 4 BCE as a vassal king for the Roman Empire, having been appointed "King of the Jews" by the Roman Senate. Herod the Great was known as a tyrant, mostly because of his campaign to kill anyone who could claim the throne. Herod had all relatives of the previous dynasty, the Hasmonean dynasty, executed. This included his wife, the daughter of a Hasmonean King, and all of her family members. Herod also created a new line of nobility that would have loyalties to only him, known as the Herodians. He appointed new high priests from families that were not connected to the past dynasty. After Herod's death, several relatives made claims to the region, beginning with the Herodian Tetrarchy.

Another aspect of Herod's legacy was economic hardship. Labor workers, which had been employed at Herod's large-scale construction sites, became impoverished. After Herod's death, the poor economy led to riots, and due to the lack of leadership in the region, the violence was not controlled. Herod's void of leadership made the region vulnerable to riots and can be considered an anticipatory cause of the Great Revolt.

Following increasing Roman domination of the Eastern Mediterranean, the initially semi-independent Herodian dynasty was officially merged into the Roman Empire in the year 6 CE. The transition of the client kingdom into a Roman province brought a great deal of tension and a Jewish uprising by Judas of Galilee erupted as a response to the Census of Quirinius.

After the death of Herod the Great and the deposition of Herod Archelaus, the Romans instituted procurators (technically prefects before 41 CE) to rule the Judeans. In the beginning, the Roman procurators respected the laws and customs of the Jewish people, allowing them to rest on the Sabbath, granting them exemption from pagan rituals, and even minting coins free of images despite the fact that elsewhere the coins bore images. When confronted with a procurator who disrespected their laws and customs, the Jews petitioned the governor of Syria to get the official removed, Roman Judea being essentially a "satellite of Syria".

The years 7–26 CE were relatively calm, but after 37 the province again began to be a source of trouble, this time for Emperor Caligula. The cause of tensions in the east of the Empire was complicated, involving the spread of Greek culture, Roman Law and the rights of Jews in the empire. Caligula did not trust the prefect of Egypt, Aulus Avilius Flaccus. Flaccus had been loyal to Tiberius, had conspired against Caligula's mother and had connections with Egyptian separatists. In 38, Caligula sent Agrippa to Alexandria unannounced to check on Flaccus. According to Philo, the visit was met with jeers from the Greek population, who saw Agrippa as the king of the Jews. Flaccus tried to placate both the Greek population and Caligula by having statues of the emperor placed in Jewish synagogues.

As a result, extensive religious riots broke out in the city. Caligula responded by removing Flaccus from his position and executing him. In 39, Agrippa accused Herod Antipas, the tetrarch of Galilee and Perea, of planning a rebellion against Roman rule with the help of Parthia. Herod Antipas confessed and Caligula exiled him. Agrippa was rewarded with his territories.

Riots again erupted in Alexandria in 40 between Jews and Greeks. Jews were accused of not honoring the emperor. Disputes occurred also in the city of Jamnia. Jews were angered by the erection of a clay altar and destroyed it. In response, Caligula ordered the erection of a statue of himself in the Jewish Temple of Jerusalem. The governor of Syria, Publius Petronius, fearing civil war if the order were carried out, delayed implementing it for nearly a year. Agrippa finally convinced Caligula to reverse the order.

In the year 46, an insurrection by the Jews broke out in Judea province. The Jacob and Simon uprising was instigated by the two eponymous brothers, and lasted between 46 and 48. The revolt, which concentrated in the Galilee, began as sporadic insurgency and in 48 was put down by Roman authorities and both brothers executed. The relatively conciliatory Roman policy in Judaea changed when Gessius Florus became procurator (64–66 CE). Nero had ordered Florus to extract a large sum of money from Jerusalem's temple and put down any resistance by deploying a locally recruited auxiliary force. When he did seize 17 talents, he justified the measure as a matter of reclaiming unpaid back taxes. Both this measure and the subsequent upheavals it provoked were not unusual: similar incidents had occurred in the past. When rioting broke out, some Jerusalemites armed themselves in self-defense, a younger group of priests called for the expulsion of all foreigners from the city, while many elders spoke out for caution and diplomacy. In the end, charismatic insurgents accompanied by armed bands entered Jerusalem, initiating a period of revolt against Rome but also internecine fighting amongst themselves.  Attempts were made to garner support from the governor of Syria—at the time, Cestius Gallus. This plea for help failed to garner any support, however. The consequent riot which erupted was the first in a series of revolts, and led to the formation of several revolutionary factions. The revolt was further intensified when Florus attempted to stop the riots, which actually incited more revolutionary zeal.

Timeline

Outbreak of the rebellion

According to Josephus, the violence which began at Caesarea in 66 was provoked by Greeks of a certain merchant house sacrificing birds in front of a local synagogue. In reaction, one of the Jewish Temple clerks Eleazar ben Hanania ceased prayers and sacrifices for the Roman Emperor at the Temple. Protests over taxation joined the list of grievances and random attacks on Roman citizens and perceived 'traitors' occurred in Jerusalem. The Jewish Temple was then breached by Roman troops at the order of the procurator Gessius Florus, who had seventeen talents removed from the treasury of the Temple, claiming the money was for the Emperor. In response to this action, the city fell into unrest and some of the Jewish population began to openly mock Florus by passing a basket around to collect money as if Florus was poor. Florus reacted to the unrest by sending soldiers into Jerusalem the next day to raid the city and arrest a number of the city leaders, who were later whipped and crucified, despite many of them being Roman citizens. Shortly, outraged Judean nationalist factions took up arms and the Roman military garrison of Jerusalem was quickly overrun by rebels. Fearing the worst, the pro-Roman king Herod Agrippa II and his sister Berenice fled Jerusalem to Galilee. Judean militias later moved upon Roman citizens of Judaea and pro-Roman officials, cleansing the country of any Roman symbols. Among other events, the Sicarii rebel faction surprised the Roman garrison of Masada and took over the fortress.

Initially the outbreak of violence had been an internal factional conflict between the Jews; those who were in favour of rebellion and those who were opposed. Huge loss of life occurred, including that of the former High Priest Ananias.  The Roman garrison on Jerusalem's western border became besieged and was unable to assist those who opposed rebellion.  Eventually, led by their commander Metilius, the garrison surrendered in exchange for unhindered passage from the city, but, led by Eliezar, the Jewish rebels slaughtered all the surrendered soldiers, except for Metilius, who was forced to convert to Judaism.

According to fourth-century church fathers Eusebius and Epiphanius of Salamis, Jerusalem's Jewish Christians fled to Pella before the beginning of the war.

Gallus' campaign and Judean provisional government

As a result of the unrest in Judaea, Cestius Gallus, the legate of Syria, assembled the Syrian legion XII Fulminata, reinforced with units of III Gallica, IV Scythica, and VI Ferrata, plus auxiliaries and allies – a total of approximately 30,000–36,000 troops, in order to restore order in the neighbouring province. The Syrian legion captured Narbata and also took Sepphoris, which surrendered without a fight. The Judean rebels, who withdrew from Sepphoris, took refuge at Atzmon hill, but were defeated following a short siege. Gallus later reached Acre in Western Galilee, and then marched on Caesarea and Jaffa, where he massacred some 8,400 people. Continuing his military campaign, Gallus took Lydda and Afek (Antipatris) and engaged Jerusalemite rebels in Geva, where he lost nearly 500 Roman troops to Judean rebels led by Simon bar Giora, reinforced by allied volunteers from Adiabene.

The Syrian legion then invested Jerusalem, but for uncertain reasons and despite initial gains withdrew back towards the coast, where it was ambushed and defeated by Judean rebels at the Battle of Beth Horon, a result that shocked the Imperial leadership. The defeat of the Romans in Beth Horon is considered one of the worst military defeats of the Roman Empire by a rebel province throughout its history. Some 6,000 Roman troops were killed and many more wounded in the battle, with Legio XII Fulminata losing its aquila, as Gallus abandoned his troops in disarray, fleeing to Syria. Victorious Judean militias included Sadducee and Pharisee factions, with a major role also played by the peasantry led by Simon Bar Giora, Zealot faction led by Eleazar ben Simon, as well as elements of the Sicarii.

Victorious Judean troops then took an initiative and attempted to expand their control to the Hellenistic city of Ashkelon, assembling an army commanded by Niger the Perean, Yohanan the Issean, and Shila the Babylonian and laying siege to the city. Despite the pillage of Ashkelon's countryside, the campaign was a disaster for the Judeans, who failed to take the city and lost some 8,000 militia men to the small defending Roman garrison. Many Jewish residents of Ashkelon were butchered by their Greco-Syrian and Roman neighbours as well in the aftermath. The failure to take Ashkelon changed the tactics of rebel Judean forces from open engagement to fortified warfare.

Following the defeat of Gallus in Beth Horon, the People's Assembly was called under the spiritual guidance of Simeon ben Gamliel and thus the Judean provisional government was formed in Jerusalem. Former High Priest Ananus ben Ananus (Hanan ben Hanan) was appointed one of the government heads and began reinforcing the city, with other prominent figure of Joseph ben Gurion, with Joshua ben Gamla taking a leading role. Josephus Matthias (Yosef ben Matityahu) was appointed the commander in Galilee and Golan, while Josephus Simon (Yosef ben Shimon) was appointed commander of Jericho, John the Issene (Yohanan Issean) commander of Jaffa, Lydda, Ammeus-Nikopolis and the whole Tamna area. Elazar Ananias (Eliezar ben Hananiya) the joint commander in Edom together with Jesus ben Sapphas (Joshua ben Zafia), with Niger the Perean the war hero during the Gallus campaign under their command. Menasseh was appointed for Perea and John Ananias (Yohanan ben Hananiya) to Gophna and Acrabetta.

Later, in Jerusalem, an attempt by Menahem ben Yehuda, leader of the Sicarii, to take control of the city failed. He was executed and the remaining Sicarii were ejected from the city to their stronghold Masada, previously taken from a Roman garrison. Headquartered in Masada, the Sicarii notably terrorized nearby Judean villages such as Ein Gedi. Simon bar Giora, a charismatic and radical peasant leader, was also expelled from Jerusalem by the new government. The faction of the ousted Bar Giora took refuge in Masada as well and stayed there until the winter of 67–68.

Vespasian's Galilee campaign

Emperor Nero sent the general Vespasian to crush the rebellion. Vespasian, along with legions X Fretensis and V Macedonica, landed at Ptolemais in April 67. There he was joined by his son Titus, who arrived from Alexandria at the head of Legio XV Apollinaris, as well as by the armies of various local allies including that of king Agrippa II. Fielding more than 60,000 soldiers, Vespasian began operations by subjugating Galilee. Judean rebels in Galilee were divided into two camps, with forces loyal to the central government in Jerusalem commanded by Josephus and representing the wealthy and priesthood classes, whereas local Zealot militias were largely packed with the poor fishermen, farmers and refugees from Roman Syria. Many towns associated with the Jewish elite gave up without a fight – including Sepphoris and Tiberias, although others had to be taken by force. Of these, Josephus provides detailed accounts of the sieges of Tarichaea, Yodfat (Jotapata) and Gamla; Gischala, the stronghold of Zealots, was also taken by force, as Zealot leaders abandoned it in the midst of the siege, heading with the bulk of their force for Jerusalem.

By the year 68, Jewish resistance in the north had been crushed, and Vespasian made Caesarea Maritima his headquarters and methodically proceeded to cleanse the coastline of the country, avoiding direct confrontation with the rebels at Jerusalem. Based on questionable numbers from Josephus, it has been estimated that the Roman vanquishing of Galilee resulted in 100,000 Jews killed or sold into slavery.

Judean regrouping and civil war

Vespasian remained camped at Caesarea Maritima until spring 68, preparing for another campaign in the Judean and Samarian highlands. The Jews, who were driven out of Galilee, rebuilt Joppa (Jaffa), which had been destroyed earlier by Cestius Gallus. Surrounded by the Romans, they rebuilt the city walls, and used a light flotilla to demoralize commerce and interrupt the grain supply to Rome from Alexandria.

In his The Jewish War Josephus wrote:

Zealot leaders of the collapsed Northern revolt, headed by John of Giscala, managed to escape from Galilee to Jerusalem with the bulk of their forces. Packed with militants of many factions, including remains of forces loyal to the Judean provisional government and significant Zealot militia headed by Eleazar ben Simon, and largely cut off by Roman forces, Jerusalem quickly descended into anarchy, with the radical Zealots taking control of large parts of the fortified city. A brutal civil war then erupted, with the Zealots and the fanatical Sicarii executing anyone advocating surrender.

Following a false message that the Judean provisional government had come to terms with the Roman Army, delivered by the Zealots to the Idumeans, a major force of some 20,000 armed Idumeans arrived to Jerusalem. It was allowed in by the Zealots and thus, with Idumeans entering Jerusalem and fighting by the side of the Zealots, the heads of the Judean provisional government, Ananus ben Ananus and Joseph ben Gurion, were killed with severe civilian casualties in the notorious Zealot Temple Siege, where Josephus reported 12,000 dead. Receiving the news of the carnage in Jerusalem, Simon bar Giora left Masada and began pillaging Idumea with his loyal troops, setting his headquarters in Na'an; he met little resistance and joined forces with Idumean leaders, including Jacob ben Susa.

Judea campaign and New Emperor

In the spring of 68, Vespasian began a systematic campaign to subdue various rebel-held strongholds in Judea proper, recapturing Afeq, Lydda, Javneh, and Jaffa that spring. He later continued into Idumea and Perea, and eventually to the Judean and Samarian highlands where Bar Giora's faction was causing major concern to the Romans. The Roman Army took Gophna, Akrabta, Bet-El, Ephraim and Hebron by July 69.

While the war in Judea was in progress, great events were occurring in Rome. In the middle of 68, the emperor Nero's increasingly erratic behavior finally lost him all support for his position. The Roman Senate, the Praetorian Guard and several prominent army commanders conspired for his removal. When the senate declared Nero an enemy of the people, he fled Rome and committed suicide with the help of a secretary. The newly installed emperor, the former Governor of Spain Galba, was murdered after just a few months by his rival, Otho, triggering a civil war that came to be known as the Year of the Four Emperors. In 69, though previously uninvolved, the popular Vespasian was also hailed emperor by the legions under his command. He decided, upon gaining further widespread support, to leave his son Titus to finish the war in Judea, while he returned to Rome to claim the throne from the usurper Vitellius, who had already deposed Otho.

Titus advanced his Roman legions on Jerusalem, capital of the rebellious province, conquering towns and creating a wave of Judean refugees. The Judean rebels avoided direct confrontation and were mostly interested in their own control and survival. The Zealot factions were weakened by civil war within the city but could still field significant troops. John, a Zealot leader, assassinated Eleazar and began a despotic rule over the city. Simon bar Giora, a leader of a major force, was invited into Jerusalem to stand against the Zealot faction of John and quickly took control of much of the city. Infighting between the factions of Bar-Giora and John followed through the year 69.

Siege of Jerusalem

The siege of Jerusalem, the fortified capital city of the province, quickly turned into a stalemate. Unable to breach the city's defenses, the Roman armies established a permanent camp just outside the city, digging a trench around the circumference of its walls and building a wall as high as the city walls themselves around Jerusalem. Anyone caught in the trench attempting to flee the city would be captured and crucified in lines on top of the dirt wall facing into Jerusalem, with as many as five hundred crucifixions occurring in a day. The two Zealot leaders, John of Gischala and Simon Bar Giora, only ceased hostilities and joined forces to defend the city when the Romans began to construct ramparts for the siege.

During the infighting inside the city walls, a stockpiled supply of dry food was intentionally burned by the Zealots to induce the defenders to fight against the siege, instead of negotiating peace; as a result many city dwellers and soldiers died of starvation during the siege. Tacitus, a contemporary historian, notes that those who were besieged in Jerusalem amounted to no fewer than six hundred thousand, that men and women alike and every age engaged in armed resistance, that everyone who could pick up a weapon did, and that both sexes showed equal determination, preferring death to a life that involved expulsion from their country. Josephus puts the number of the besieged at near 1 million. Many pilgrims from the Jewish diaspora who, undeterred by the war, had trekked to Jerusalem to be present at the Temple during Passover, became trapped in Jerusalem during the siege and perished.

In the summer of 70, following a seven-month siege, Titus eventually used the collapse of several of the city walls to breach Jerusalem, ransacking and burning nearly the entire city. The Romans began by attacking the weakest spot: the third wall. It was built shortly before the siege so it did not have as much time invested in its protection. They succeeded towards the end of May and shortly afterwards broke through the more important second wall. During the final stages of the Roman attack, Zealots under John of Giscala still held the Temple, while the Sicarii, led by Simon Bar Giora, held the upper city. The Second Temple (the renovated Herod's Temple), one of the last fortified bastions of the rebellion, was destroyed on Tisha B'Av (29 or 30 July 70).

All three walls of Jerusalem were eventually destroyed as well as the Temple and the citadels; the city was then put to the torch, with most survivors taken into slavery; some of those overturned stones and their place of impact can still be seen. John of Giscala surrendered at Agrippa II's fortress of Jotapata while Simon Bar Giora surrendered at the site where the Temple once stood. The Temple of Jerusalem's treasures, including the Menorah and the Table of the Bread of God's Presence, which had previously only ever been seen by the High Priest of the Temple, were paraded through the streets of Rome during Titus' triumphal procession, along with some 700 Judean prisoners who were paraded in chains, among them John of Giscala and Simon Bar Giora. John of Giscala was sentenced to life imprisonment while Simon Bar Giora was executed. The triumph was commemorated with the Arch of Titus, which depicts the Temple's treasures being paraded. With the fall of Jerusalem, some insurrection still continued in isolated locations in Judea, lasting as long as 73.

Last strongholds

During the spring of 71, Titus set sail for Rome. A new military governor was then appointed from Rome, Sextus Lucilius Bassus, whose assigned task was to undertake the "mopping-up" operations in Judea. He used X Fretensis to besiege and capture the few remaining fortresses that still resisted. Bassus took Herodium, and then crossed the Jordan to capture the fortress of Machaerus on the shore of the Dead Sea and then continued into the Forest of Jardus on the northern shore of the Dead Sea to pursue some 3,000 Judean rebels under the leadership of Judah ben Ari, whom he swiftly defeated. Because of illness, Bassus did not live to complete his mission. Lucius Flavius Silva replaced him, and moved against the last Judean stronghold, Masada, in the autumn of 72. He used Legio X, auxiliary troops, and thousands of Jewish prisoners, for a total of 10,000 soldiers. After his orders for surrender were rejected, Silva established several base camps and circumvallated the fortress. According to Josephus, when the Romans finally broke through the walls of this citadel in 73, they discovered that 960 of the 967 defenders had committed suicide.

Aftermath

Casualties 

The Roman suppression of the revolt had a significant demographic impact on the Jews of the Land of Israel; many perished in battle and due to siege conditions. The city of Jerusalem was entirely destroyed; it is unlikely that many Jews survived in Jerusalem or the surrounding area. Many of the Jewish rebels were scattered or sold into slavery.

Josephus claimed that 1,100,000 people were killed during the siege of Jerusalem, 97,000 were captured and enslaved and many others fled to areas around the Mediterranean. A significant portion of the deaths was due to illnesses and hunger brought about by the Romans. "A pestilential destruction upon them, and soon afterward such a famine, as destroyed them more suddenly." Seth Schwartz rejected Josephus' estimates of the death toll as being impossible because, in his estimations, there were about a million people living in Palestine at the time, of which about half were Jews, and significant Jewish populations continued to live there after the war, even in Judea, which was severely damaged. However, according to Schwartz, the reported figure of 97,000 captives taken during the war is much more reliable. This would suggest that a sizeable segment of the population was either driven out of the country or, at the very least, displaced.

Despite the heavy losses and the destruction of the Temple, Jewish life continued to thrive in Judea. However, dissatisfaction with Roman rule eventually led to the Bar Kokhba revolt of 132–136 CE, which appears to have resulted in Judaea's destruction and depopulation.

Economic consequences 
The revolt affected Judaea's economic and social environment, as well as, to a lesser extent, the Jewish world at large. Due to the influx of pilgrims and wealth from the Roman and Parthian Empires, which concentrated vast wealth in Jerusalem, the Second Temple had developed into a massive economy by the first century, but the destruction of the city and the temple brought this establishment to an end. Additionally, according to Josephus and other scholars, the Romans confiscated and auctioned off all Jewish land or all land held by Jews who had participated in the insurrection.

Vespasian settled 800 Roman veterans in Motza, which became a Roman settlement known as Colonia Amosa or Colonia Emmaus. He strengthened Roman control over the province by giving Caesarea colony status and Neapolis city status, and by garrisoning Legio X Fretensis in Jerusalem permanently.

The Jewish Encyclopedia article on the Hebrew Alphabet states: "Not until the revolts against Nero and against Hadrian did the Jews return to the use of the old Hebrew script on their coins, which they did from motives similar to those which had governed them two or three centuries previously; both times, it is true, only for a brief period."

Religious developments 
The destruction of the Second Temple in 70 CE marked a turning point in Judaism. In the absence of the Temple, Judaism responded by more devoted observance to the commandments of the Torah, and by making the synagogue the center of Jewish life. Synagogues, which were previously present before the revolt, acquired prominence and replaced the temple as a major meeting place for Jews, and rabbis took the place of high priests as the Jewish community's leaders. The rabbis filled the void of Jewish leadership in the aftermath of the Great Revolt, and, through their literature and teachings, helped Judaism adapt in the absence of the Temple. Because of the rabbis' dominance after 70 CE, the era is sometimes known as the rabbinic period. 

According to rabbinic literature, the Pharisaic sage and Rabbi Yohanan ben Zakkai was smuggled away from Jerusalem in a coffin by his students. He then met with Vespasian before his departure and obtained his permission to establish a Jewish center at Yavne. There, he issued a number of enactments intended to reshape Jewish life and adapt it to the post-destruction reality. The center at Yavne became a major hub of Talmudic study (see Mishnah). According to one theory, now largely discarded, a council at Yavneh also finalized the canon of the Hebrew Bible.

These events became a crucial mark in the development of the Rabbinic Judaism, which would emphasize Torah study and communal synagogue worship, what would allow Jews to continue their culture and religion without the Temple and in the diaspora. The religious reaction to the destruction was also evident through changes in halakhah (Jewish law), midrashim, and the Syriac Apocalypse of Baruch, all of which mention the agony of the temple's destruction.

In Rome 
Scholars contend that the new Flavian dynasty utilized its victory over the Jews to establish legitimacy for its claim to rule the empire. A triumph was held in Rome to celebrate the fall of Jerusalem, and two triumphal arches (the Arch of Titus on the Via Sacra and the Arch of Titus by the Circus Maximus) were built there. The Flavian dynasty also launched an extensive series of coins titled Judaea Capta to celebrate the victory.

According to Philostratus's Life of Apollonius, Titus refused to accept a wreath of victory offered by the groups neighboring Judaea, on the grounds that he had only been the instrument of divine wrath.

Further wars

The Great Revolt of Judea marked the beginning of the Jewish–Roman wars, which radically changed the Eastern Mediterranean and had a crucial impact on the development of the Roman Empire and the Jews. Despite the defeat of the Great Revolt, tensions continued to build in the region. With the Parthian threat from the East, major Jewish communities throughout the Eastern Mediterranean revolted in 117 CE. The revolt, known as the Kitos War in 115–117, which took place mainly in the diaspora (in Cyprus, Egypt, Mesopotamia and only marginally in Judea), while poorly-organized, was extremely violent and took two years for the Roman armies to subdue. Although only the final chapter of the Kitos War was fought in Judea, the revolt is considered part of the Jewish–Roman Wars. The immense number of casualties during the Kitos War depopulated Cyrenaica and Cyprus and also reduced Jewish and Greco-Roman populations in the region.

The third and final conflict in the Jewish–Roman Wars erupted in Judea, known as the Bar Kokhba revolt of 132–136 CE, concentrating in Judea province and led by Simon bar Kokhba. Although Bar Kokhba was initially successful against Roman forces and established a short-lived state, the eventual Roman effort defeated Bar Kokhba's rebels. The result was a level of destruction and death that has been described as a genocide of the Jews, a ban on Judaism, and the renaming of the province from Judea to Syria Palaestina, with many Jews being sold into slavery or fleeing to other areas around the Mediterranean. Although Hadrian's death (in 137 CE) eased restrictions and persecution of the Jews, the Jewish population of Judea had been greatly reduced.

Sources
The main account of the revolt comes from The Jewish War of Josephus, a former Jewish commander of Galilee, who, after capture by the Romans after the Siege of Yodfat, attempted to end the rebellion by negotiating with the Judeans on Titus's behalf. Josephus and Titus became close friends, and later Josephus was granted Roman citizenship and a pension. He never returned to his homeland after the fall of Jerusalem, living in Rome as a historian under the patronage of Vespasian and Titus. Other accounts of the revolts, though not as accurate as Josephus, come from the Histories of Tacitus, The Twelve Caesars of Suetonius and the Strategemata of Frontinus.

A History of the Jewish War was written by Jewish historian Justus of Tiberias, but it has been lost and survives only in quotes by Josephus, Eusebius and Jerome. It was apparently very critical towards The Jewish War of Josephus, prompting a harsh response from him in his autobiography.

Another account of the revolt comes from a 4th century chronicle written in Latin by an anonymous author, erroneously thought to be Hegesippus in the past and thus commonly referred to as Pseudo-Hegesippus. However, such work is usually seen as nothing more than a rewriting of The Jewish War of Josephus with blatant anti-Jewish and pro-Christian alterations, and is therefore dismissed as unreliable by scholars.

In modern fiction
The events leading to the First Jewish – Roman War and the war itself are depicted in Window To Yesterday The Swordsman.

The First Jewish – Roman War and the Siege of Jerusalem are depicted in The Lost Wisdom of the Magi.

The First Jewish – Roman War and the Siege of Jerusalem are depicted in The Legend of Destruction 2021 Israeli film.

See also
 First Jewish Revolt coinage
 History of the Jews in Italy
 History of the Jews in the Roman Empire
 Josephus problem
 List of conflicts in the Near East
 Religious persecution in the Roman Empire
 Sicaricon (Jewish law)
 List of Jewish civil wars

References

Further reading
 Berlin, Andrea, and J. Andrew Overman, eds. 2002. The First Jewish Revolt: Archaeology, History, and Ideology. New York: Routledge.
 Goodman, Martin. 1987. The Ruling Class of Judaea: The Origins of the Jewish Revolt against Rome A.D. 66–70. New York: Cambridge University Press.
 Popović, Mladen. 2011. The Jewish Revolt Against Rome: Interdisciplinary Perspectives. Leiden: Brill.
 Price, Jonathan J. 1992. Jerusalem under Siege: The Collapse of the Jewish State, 66–70 AD. Brill's Series in Jewish Studies 3. Leiden, The Netherlands: Brill.
 Rajak, Tessa. 1983. Josephus: The Historian and His Society. London: Duckworth.
 Reeder, Caryn A. 2015. "Gender, War, and Josephus." Journal for the Study of Judaism 46, no. 1: 65–85.
 ———. 2017. "Wartime Rape, the Romans, and the First Jewish Revolt." Journal for the Study of Judaism 48, no. 3: 363–85.
 Spilsbury, Paul. 2003. "Flavius Josephus on the Rise and Fall of the Roman Empire." The Journal of Theological Studies 54, no. 1: 1–24.
 Tuval, Michael. 2013. From Jerusalem Priest to Roman Jew: On Josephus and the Paradigms of Ancient Judaism. Tübingen: Mohr Siebeck.

External links
 
 
In Depth Lecture on the First Roman-Jewish War and Destruction of the 2nd Tempe Thinktorah.org

 
1st-century Judaism
60s conflicts
60s in the Roman Empire
66
70s conflicts
70s in the Roman Empire
73
1st-century rebellions
Flavian military campaigns
Judea (Roman province)
Rebellions in Asia
Religion-based wars
Year of the Four Emperors